Karanjwan Dam, is an earthfill dam on Kadwa river near Dindori in state of Maharashtra in India.

Specifications

Purpose
 Irrigation
 Electricity generation

See also
 Dams in Maharashtra
 List of reservoirs and dams in India

References

Dams in Nashik district
Dams completed in 1974
1974 establishments in Maharashtra